The Yuam River ( is a river in northwestern Thailand, part of the Salween watershed. It originates in the mountains of the Thanon Thong Chai Range, Khun Yuam District, Mae Hong Son Province, Thailand. The river flows in a north–south direction and then in Sop Moei District it bends westwards and then northwestwards, forming a stretch of the Thai/Burmese border shortly before it joins the left bank of the Moei River, shortly before its confluence with the Salween.

The Ngao River, which unlike most rivers in Thailand flows northwards, is one of the Yuam's main tributaries.

Environment
The Thai government, to solve persistent water shortages in the central region, have proposed a 70.7 billion baht plan to divert some 1.8 billion m3 of water annually from the Yuam River to the perennially-underfilled Bhumibol Dam. As part of the plan, the Royal Irrigation Department (RID), would build 69 metre high dam with a storage capacity of 68.7 million m3 constructed on 2,075 rai of forest land, together with a pumping station on a separate 55 rai plot and a 61.5 kilometre-long tunnel passing through 14 villages. The inhabitants of the area—primarily Karen tribes people—largely oppose the project. In December 2019, the RID submitted a second environmental impact assessment (EIA) to the Office of the Natural Resources and Environmental Policy and Planning (ONEP). ONEP rejected the EIA for the second time due to concerns about forest destruction, tunnel rock waste, and compensation issues.

See also
River systems of Thailand
Mae Ngao National Park

References

External links

Mai Ngao National Park
Nam Ngao
Thailand's Salween River and Mae Ngao National Park

Yuam
Salween River